Bill Allred may refer to:

Bill Allred (radio host)
Bill Allred (musician), father of John Allred (musician)